Domingo Julio Rojo Sr. (May 22, 1894 – December 27, 1958) was a Cuban professional baseball catcher who played in the American Negro leagues from the 1910s to the 1930s.

A native of Sagua la Grande, Cuba, Rojo made his Negro leagues debut in 1916 for the Cuban Stars (East), and enjoyed a long and productive career with multiple teams, including the Bacharach Giants, Baltimore Black Sox, and Lincoln Giants. He also played for and managed the Habana club in the Cuban League. Rojo died in 1958 at age 64.

References

External links
 and Baseball-Reference Black Baseball stats and Seamheads

1894 births
1958 deaths
Bacharach Giants players
Baltimore Black Sox players
Chicago American Giants players
Cuban Stars (East) players
Habana players
Lincoln Giants players
Baseball catchers
Cuban baseball players
People from Sagua la Grande